Minor league players and teams affiliated with the Washington Nationals professional baseball organization include:

Players

Jake Alu

Jacob Alu (born April 6, 1997) is an American professional baseball Infielder in the Washington Nationals organization.

Alu was born and raised in Hamilton Square, New Jersey, a community located within Hamilton Township, Mercer County, New Jersey. Alu attended Princeton Day School in Princeton, New Jersey. In 2015, Alu enrolled as a business major in the Carroll School of Management at Boston College. He graduated in 2019 with a degree in Business Management.
While still a senior at Princeton Day School in 2015, Alu registered .523 batting average with 3 home runs and 18 RBIs. He recorded recording his 100th hit on April 28, 2015.

In 2016, as a freshman at Boston College, Alu appeared in 10 games with .500 batting average, entering as a pinch runner eight times and a pinch hitter twice.
As a sophomore in 2017, he played in 48 games, making 45 starts – 29 in left field, 10 at second base, five as the designated hitter and one shortstop. That year, Alu registered .331 with 23 RBIs. In 2017, he played collegiate summer baseball with the Bourne Braves of the Cape Cod Baseball League. As a Junior in 2018, Alu registered .216 batting average with 2 home runs and 19 RBIs. 

2019 was a pivotal year for Jake Alu's career after he was acquired by Washington Nationals in the 24th round of the 2019 Major League Baseball Draft to play for their Auburn (N.Y.) Doubledays affiliate, a Low-A team that competes in the New York–Penn League. He was also named as a 3rd team All-ACC performer at Boston College after he batted .343 with 40 RBIs. The same year, Alu also played in Atlantic Coast Conference baseball tournament. Alu did not play in a game in 2020 due to the cancellation of the minor league season because of the COVID-19 pandemic.

Alu was optioned to the Triple-A Rochester Red Wings to begin the 2023 season.

Yasel Antuna

Yasel Eneudy Antuna (born October 26, 1999) is a Dominican professional baseball infielder in the Washington Nationals organization.

The Nationals signed Antuna to a minor league contract as an amateur free agent out of the Dominican Republic on July 2, 2016. They gave Antuna a $3.9 million signing bonus, the largest they had ever awarded an international free agent by $2.4 million to that point. Antuna was described by scouts at the time as a potential five-tool player who profiled as a future everyday shortstop in the major leagues.

Antuna debuted professionally in the Gulf Coast League with the GCL Nationals in 2017, appearing in games at shortstop and third base. He played in both games of a double-header on July 23, 2017, in which the GCL Nationals no-hit the GCL Marlins in both seven-inning games, committing a throwing error in the second game that accounted for one of the Marlins' two baserunners in the contest. Midseason rankings that month by MLB Pipeline ranked Antuna as the Nationals' eighth-best prospect. Antuna finished his 2017 season with a .301 batting average in the Gulf Coast League, playing mostly shortstop with several appearances at third base as well.

In August 2018, Antuna underwent season-ending Tommy John surgery. Antuna appeared in three games for the GCL Nationals late in the 2019 season, after which Baseball America ranked him as the Nationals' ninth-best prospect. Antuna was a non-roster invitee to the Nationals' 60-man player pool for the 2020 season, which was affected by the COVID-19 pandemic. After the season, the Nationals selected Antuna's contract, promoting him to the 40-man roster to protect him from the Rule 5 draft.

Antuna was assigned to the High-A Wilmington Blue Rocks to begin his 2021 campaign, alongside a number of other Washington top prospects. On December 1, 2022, Antuna was sent outright off of the 40-man roster.

Darren Baker

Darren John Baker (born February 11, 1999) is an American professional baseball second baseman in the Washington Nationals organization.

Baker is the son of former MLB player and manager Dusty Baker. Darren served as the batboy for the San Francisco Giants, while his father was managing the team. During game five of the 2002 World Series, Darren narrowly missed being run over at home plate by baserunner David Bell before being grabbed and lifted by his jacket out of the way by J. T. Snow, before a collision could occur.

Baker attended Jesuit High School in Sacramento, California. He was drafted by the Washington Nationals in the 27th round of the 2017 Major League Baseball draft, but did not sign and played college baseball at the University of California, Berkeley. In 2019, he played collegiate summer baseball with the Wareham Gatemen of the Cape Cod Baseball League and was named a league all-star. After four years at Berkeley, he was again drafted by the Nationals, this time in the 10th round of the 2021 MLB draft, and signed.

Baker spent his first professional season with the Florida Complex League Nationals and Fredericksburg Nationals. He played 2022 with the Wilmington Blue Rocks and Harrisburg Senators. In July, he played in the All-Star Futures Game.

Matt Brill

Matthew Ryan Brill (born October 25, 1994) is an American professional baseball pitcher in the Washington Nationals organization.

Brill attended Moline High School in Moline, Illinois, where he played baseball and soccer. In 2013, his senior year, he went 6–2 with a 1.76 ERA alongside hitting six home runs. He was drafted by the New York Mets in the 24th round of the 2013 Major League Baseball draft but did not sign and instead chose to play college baseball at Appalachian State University.

In 2014, Brill's freshman year at Appalachian State, he spent a majority of the year as a designated hitter, batting .306 with four home runs and twenty RBIs over 39 games. As a sophomore in 2015, he began to pitch, going 0–2 with a 10.12 ERA over  innings, alongside hitting .277 with two home runs over 26 games. Brill missed all of the 2016 season after undergoing Tommy John surgery. He returned to play in 2017, batting .261 with five home runs over 25 games alongside pitching to a 1–3 record and 4.45 ERA over twenty relief appearances. After the season, Brill was selected by the Arizona Diamondbacks in the 12th round of the 2017 Major League Baseball draft as a pitcher.

Brill signed with Arizona and made his professional debut with the Hillsboro Hops of the Class A Short Season Northwest League, compiling a 0.89 ERA and 25 strikeouts over  relief innings. In 2018, Brill began the year with the Kane County Cougars of the Class A Midwest League, with whom he was named an All-Star, before earning a promotion to the Visalia Rawhide of the Class A-Advanced California League in June. Over 43 relief appearances between the two clubs, Brill went 6–4 with a 3.74 ERA, striking out 65 batters over 53 innings. Brill began 2019 with Visalia and was promoted to the Jackson Generals of the Class AA Southern League in May. He finished the year with a 4–5 record and a 5.11 ERA over 44 relief innings pitched. He was assigned to the Salt River Rafters of the Arizona Fall League after the season.

Brill did not play a minor league game in 2020 due to the cancellation of the minor league season caused by the COVID-19 pandemic. Brill was assigned to the Amarillo Sod Poodles of the Double-A Central for the 2021 season, going 2–4 with a 6.33 ERA and 37 strikeouts over 27 innings pitched in relief.

After the 2021 season, the Washington Nationals selected Brill from the Diamondbacks in the minor league phase of the Rule 5 draft. He opened the 2022 season with the Harrisburg Senators of the Double-A Eastern League and was later promoted to the Rochester Red Wings of the Triple-A International League.

Zach Brzykcy

Zachary John-William Brzykcy (born July 12, 1999) is an American professional baseball pitcher in the Washington Nationals organization.

Brzykcy attended Alexander Central High School in Taylorsville, North Carolina, where he was named Northwestern Conference Pitcher of the Year in 2017. He went on to attend Virginia Polytechnic Institute and State University, where he was the regular closer for the Hokies. He also played in the Cape Cod Baseball League during the summer of 2019, leading the league that summer with seven saves for the Falmouth Commodores. With the 2020 Major League Baseball draft shortened to just five rounds, despite ranking as the 180th-best draft prospect in 2020 according to MLB Pipeline, Brzykcy went undrafted. Brzykcy was scouted by longtime Washington Nationals scout Bobby Myrick and chose to sign with the Nationals as a non-drafted free agent.

In 2021, Brzykcy was assigned to the High-A Wilmington Blue Rocks to begin his professional baseball career. He earned his first win on May 12, 2021, striking out seven in four scoreless relief innings.

He complements that primary pitch with a sharp breaking ball.

Gerardo Carrillo

Gerardo Carrillo (born September 13, 1998) is a Mexican professional baseball pitcher in the Washington Nationals organization.

Carrillo signed with the Los Angeles Dodgers as an international free agent in 2016 and began his professional career the following year with the Dominican Summer League Dodgers. He played for the Arizona League Dodgers and Great Lakes Loons in 2018 and the Rancho Cucamonga Quakes in 2019. The Dodgers added him to their 40-man roster after the 2020 season. He began the 2021 season with the Double-A Tulsa Drillers, where he was 3–2 with a 4.25 ERA in 15 games (14 starts). On July 30, 2021, he was traded to the Washington Nationals (along with Josiah Gray, Donovan Casey, and Keibert Ruiz) in exchange for Trea Turner and Max Scherzer. He was designated for assignment on December 20, 2022.

Donovan Casey

 Donovan Casey (born February 23, 1996) is an American professional baseball outfielder in the Washington Nationals organization.

A native of Stratford, New Jersey, Casey played college baseball for Boston College. In 2017, he played collegiate summer baseball with the Chatham Anglers of the Cape Cod Baseball League. Casey was selected by the Los Angeles Dodgers in the 20th round of the 2017 MLB Draft. He played for the Ogden Raptors and Arizona League Dodgers in 2017, the Rancho Cucamonga Quakes in 2018 and the Quakes and Tulsa Drillers in 2019. He did not play a minor league game in 2020 since the season was cancelled due to the COVID-19 pandemic. On July 30, 2021, he was traded to the Washington Nationals (along with Josiah Gray, Gerardo Carrillo, and Keibert Ruiz) in exchange for Trea Turner and Max Scherzer.

Casey was selected as one of eight Nationals to participate in the Arizona Fall League in 2021, frequently leading off and playing center field for the Surprise Saguaros. On November 19, 2021, the Nationals selected his contract and promoted him to the 40-man roster for the first time. He was called up to the majors for the first time on April 15, 2022, but was optioned back several days later without appearing in an MLB game. He was sent outright off the 40-man roster on August 9, 2022.

Jackson Cluff

Jackson Paul Cluff (born December 3, 1996) is an American professional baseball infielder in the Washington Nationals organization.

Cluff attended and played baseball for Brigham Young University, but he took time away from the sport on a two-year mission to Atlanta. After returning for his 2019 collegiate season, Cluff was drafted in the sixth round by the Nationals and turned pro. Cluff made his professional debut with the Class-A Hagerstown Suns, hitting .229 with five home runs, five triples, and eight doubles over 62 games in 2019.

Although the 2020 minor league season was canceled, Cluff was named to the Nationals' 60-man "player pool", working out with other top prospects and some major league players in Fredericksburg, Virginia. He was not called up to the major leagues during the 2020 season.

The Nationals invited Cluff to participate again with major league players in 2021 spring training. He was reassigned to the minors and began the season with the Class-AA Harrisburg Senators, two steps up from where he finished out the 2019 season. Cluff participated in the Arizona Fall League and was named the league's Defensive Player of the Year for his work as the regular starting shortstop with the Surprise Saguaros.

Cluff is noted as a nimble player with a quick left-handed swing and the arm and footwork to handle any infield spot defensively. As of the start of the 2021 season, he has spent the majority of his time as a professional as a shortstop.

Matt Cronin

Matthew G. Cronin (born September 20, 1997) is an American professional baseball pitcher in the Washington Nationals organization.

Cronin was a pure reliever at the University of Arkansas, coming out of the bullpen in all 65 of his appearances in his collegiate career. The Nationals drafted him in the fourth round of the 2019 Major League Baseball draft, and after he signed with Washington, he was assigned to the Class-A Hagerstown Suns for the remainder of the 2019 season. He put up a 0.82 ERA in his first professional season, striking out 41 batters in 22 innings, and was named to the Nationals' player pool during the COVID-19 pandemic–shortened 2020 season, although he was not called up to the major leagues.

Before the 2021 season, Cronin ranked as the organization's ninth-best prospect, according to Baseball America. The Nationals invited him to participate in major league spring training in 2021. After spring training, Cronin was assigned to the High-A Wilmington Blue Rocks to begin the 2021 season, although MLB Pipeline speculated that he could rise quickly in a relief role.

Cronin was optioned to the Triple-A Rochester Red Wings to begin the 2023 season.

Cronin pitches left-handed, with a fastball up to  that plays up due to its high spin rate, along with a splitter and a curveball.

Armando Cruz

Armando Cruz (born January 16, 2004) is a Dominican professional baseball shortstop in the Washington Nationals organization.

Born and raised in Santo Domingo, Cruz emerged as a high-level baseball prospect by the time he was 14. He played in the 2018 14U Select Festival and a Perfect Game showcase the following year in Florida.

Cruz was linked to the Washington Nationals as early as 2019, before he was eligible to sign with a Major League Baseball team. The Nationals officially signed Cruz for a $3.9 million bonus on January 15, 2021, tying the franchise record for an international amateur free agent bonus (with Yasel Antuna), one day before Cruz's 17th birthday.

At the time Cruz turned pro, he was ranked as the fifth-best international amateur prospect by MLB Pipeline and the second-best by Baseball America. A contemporaneous Minor League Baseball news report described him as possibly the best defensive player available in the international signing period, as well as an above-average runner.

Jeremy De La Rosa

Jeremy José De La Rosa (born January 16, 2002) is a Dominican professional baseball outfielder in the Washington Nationals organization.

The Nationals signed De La Rosa as an international amateur free agent out of the Dominican Republic, where he trained at the Quality Baseball Academy, for a reported $300,000 bonus on July 2, 2018. After signing De La Rosa, the Nationals sent him to their instructional league in West Palm Beach, Florida, that fall.

De La Rosa ranked as the Nationals' twelfth-best prospect entering the 2019 season, according to MLB Pipeline. Baseball America praised his "promising tools" and ability to make contact at the plate without swinging out of the strike zone. Mark Scialabba, the Nationals' player development director, named De La Rosa as one of his breakout candidates in 2019. De La Rosa did not play in a game in 2020 due to the cancellation of the minor league season because of the COVID-19 pandemic.

De La Rosa was optioned to the Double-A Harrisburg Senators to begin the 2023 season.

Mason Denaburg

Mason Alan Denaburg (born August 8, 1999) is an American professional baseball pitcher in the Washington Nationals organization.

Denaburg attended Merritt Island High School in Merritt Island, Florida. As a senior, he pitched to a 0.99 ERA in 35.1 innings along with batting .410 with five home runs and 21 RBIs. He committed to play college baseball at the University of Florida.

Denaburg was drafted 27th overall by the Washington Nationals in the 2018 MLB Draft. He signed with the organization on July 3. Denaburg did not appear in a game during the 2018 season. He made his professional debut for the Gulf Coast League Nationals on June 24, 2019. Over  innings, he pitched to a 7.52 ERA, walking 14 while striking out 19. He did not play a minor league game in 2020 due to the cancellation of the minor league season caused by the COVID-19 pandemic.

In early April 2021, it was announced that Denaburg had undergone Tommy John surgery.

Tyler Dyson

Tyler Dyson (born December 24, 1997) is an American professional baseball pitcher in the Washington Nationals organization.

Dyson attended Braden River High School in Bradenton, Florida. As a senior, he pitched to a 6–1 record with a 0.38 ERA along with batting .333 with two home runs and 17 RBIs. Undrafted out of high school in the 2016 MLB draft, he enrolled at the University of Florida to play college baseball for the Florida Gators.

As a freshman at Florida in 2017, Dyson went 4–0 with a 3.23 ERA in 39 innings. Dyson started Game 3 of the Gainesville Super Regional of the 2017 NCAA Division I baseball tournament against Wake Forest and struck out seven batters over five innings, clinching a trip to the College World Series. He also started the clinching game of the CWS against LSU, which Florida eventually won. That summer, he played in the Northwoods League where he posted a 1.59 ERA over  innings. In 2018, as a sophomore, Dyson appeared in 14 games (11 starts) in which he pitched to a 5–3 record with a 4.47 ERA. Following the season, he played for the Falmouth Commodores of the Cape Cod Baseball League, compiling a 2.37 ERA in 19 innings. Prior to the 2019 season, Dyson was named to the Golden Spikes Award watch list along with being named a Baseball America preseason All-American. For the season, he appeared in 11 games (nine starts), pitching to a 3–2 record with a 4.95 ERA.

Dyson was selected by the Washington Nationals in the fifth round of the 2019 Major League Baseball draft and signed for $500,000. He made his professional debut with the Rookie-level Gulf Coast League Nationals before being promoted to the Auburn Doubledays of the Class A Short Season New York–Penn League after one game. Over nine starts between the two teams, Dyson went 2–1 with a 1.07 ERA, striking out 17 over  innings. He did not play a minor league game in 2020 due to the cancellation of the minor league season caused by the COVID-19 pandemic. In 2021, he participated in major league spring training with the Nationals before being assigned to the Wilmington Blue Rocks. He was placed on the injured list in mid-June and missed the remainder of the season. Over ten games (six starts), Dyson went 1–3 with a 2.84 ERA and thirty strikeouts over  innings.

José Ferrer

José Alexander Ferrer (born March 3, 2000) is a Dominican professional baseball pitcher in the Washington Nationals organization.

Ferrer signed with the Washington Nationals as an international free agent in July 2017. He made his professional debut in 2018 with the Dominican Summer League Nationals. In 2022, he was selected to play in the All-Star Futures Game.

The Nationals added Ferrer to their 40-man roster after the 2022 season.

Trey Harris

Terone Sevante Harris (born January 15, 1996) is an American professional baseball outfielder in the Washington Nationals organization.

Harris attended McEachern High School in Powder Springs, Georgia. In 2014, his senior year, he hit .487 with seven home runs and 31 RBIs. Undrafted in the 2014 Major League Baseball draft, he enrolled at the University of Missouri where he played college baseball.

In 2015, Harris' freshman year at Missouri, he hit .263 with four home runs and 22 RBIs over 53 games, earning a spot on the SEC All-Freshman team. As a sophomore in 2016, he batted .213 with one home runs and 36 RBIs in 53 games. After the season, he played collegiate summer baseball for the Harwich Mariners of the Cape Cod Baseball League, and also played in the New England Collegiate Baseball League. In 2017, as a junior, he compiled a .268 batting average with a career-high 12 home runs and 48 RBIs in 52 games. In 2018, Harris' senior season, he slashed .316/.413/.516 with 11 home runs, fifty RBIs, and 12 stolen bases over 56 games. After the season, he was drafted by the Atlanta Braves in the 32nd round of the 2018 Major League Baseball draft.

Harris signed with the Braves and made his professional debut with the Rookie-level Gulf Coast League Braves, and, after 22 games, was promoted to the Rome Braves of the Class A Short Season South Atlantic League, with whom he finished the year. Over 53 games between the two teams, he hit .302 with one home run and 29 RBIs. In 2019, he returned to Rome, with whom he was named an All-Star. In June, he was promoted to the Florida Fire Frogs of the Class A-Advanced Florida State League, and in July, he was promoted to the Mississippi Braves of the Class AA Southern League, with whom he finished the season. Over 131 games between the three clubs, Harris slashed .323/.389/.498 with 14 home runs and 73 RBIs. He was selected to play in the Arizona Fall League for the Scottsdale Scorpions following the season and was named an All-Star.

Harris did not play a minor league game in 2020 due to the cancellation of the minor league season caused by the COVID-19 pandemic. For the 2021 season, he returned to Mississippi, now members of the Double-A South, slashing .247/.317/.354 with eight home runs and fifty RBIs over 96 games. He returned to Mississippi to begin the 2022 season.

On August 1, 2022, Harris was traded to the Washington Nationals for Ehire Adrianza. He was assigned to the Harrisburg Senators of the Double-A Eastern League. Over 96 games between Mississippi and Harrisburg, he batted .241 with five home runs and 27 RBIs.

 He was assigned to the AA Harrisburg Senators

Cole Henry

Jeffrey Cole Henry (born July 15, 1999) is an American professional baseball pitcher in the Washington Nationals organization.

Henry is from Florence, Alabama, and attended school at Louisiana State University. As a freshman, he was voted onto the 2019 NCAA Baton Rouge Regional All-Tournament team. He was also named one of the Southeastern Conference's Freshman of the Week on April 19, 2019. As a sophomore, Henry was the Friday night starter for the LSU Tigers, prior to the cancellation of the 2020 baseball season due to the COVID-19 pandemic. That June, Henry was drafted in the second round of the 2020 draft by the Nationals and chose to turn pro.

Henry appeared in one game with the Nationals during 2021 spring training. He was assigned to the High-A Wilmington Blue Rocks, alongside other top prospects, to begin the season. After missing time during the 2021 season with injuries, Henry was invited to participate in the Arizona Fall League alongside seven other Nationals prospects. Henry pitched as both a starter and a reliever for the Surprise Saguaros and was named to represent the Nationals in the Fall Stars Game, although he was unable to play.

A right-handed pitcher, Henry commands a fastball that touches  and has an above-average changeup. As of December 2020, he was ranked as the Nationals' third-best prospect by MLB Pipeline.

Jake Irvin

Jacob David Irvin (born February 18, 1997) is an American professional baseball pitcher in the Washington Nationals organization.

Irvin attended Thomas Jefferson High School in Bloomington, Minnesota. He was drafted by the Minnesota Twins in the 37th round of the 2015 Major League Baseball Draft, but did not sign and played college baseball at the University of Oklahoma. He was then drafted by the Washington Nationals in the fourth round of the 2018 MLB Draft, and signed.

The Nationals added Irvin to their 40-man roster after the 2022 season. Irvin was optioned to the Triple-A Rochester Red Wings to begin the 2023 season.

Andry Lara

Andry José Lara (born January 6, 2003) is a Venezuelan professional baseball pitcher in the Washington Nationals organization.

Lara trained at Zulia Academy as an amateur, overcoming knee problems as a youth and adding considerable velocity as he grew in strength. MLB Pipeline considered him the sixteenth-best prospect in the 2019 international amateur free agent class and the best overall pitcher. The Nationals signed Lara for a reported $1.25 million bonus on July 2, 2019. He was the Nationals' top-ranked international signee for the period.

In 2021, Lara made his professional debut, advancing during the minor league season from the Florida Complex League Nationals to the Low-A Fredericksburg Nationals while appearing primarily as a starting pitcher.

Lara is right-handed and was described by MLB Pipeline at the time of his signing as a potential future frontline starter. Along with a two-seam fastball that sits in the mid-90s, Lara throws a breaking ball and a changeup.

Gilbert Lara

Gilbert Lara Peguero (born October 30, 1997) is a Dominican professional baseball shortstop in the Washington Nationals organization.

The Milwaukee Brewers signed Lara for a $3.1 million signing bonus. Lara made his professional debut with the Arizona Brewers of the Rookie-level Arizona League in 2015, and he was promoted to the Helena Brewers in August. Lara ended 2015 with a .240 batting average, with one home run and 30 RBIs in 63 games. Lara returned to Helena for the whole 2016 season where he batted .250 with two home runs and 28 RBIs. In 2017, Lara played for the Wisconsin Timber Rattlers where he posted a .193 average, three home runs and 22 RBIs.

Lara was acquired by the Washington Nationals on August 31, 2018, along with catcher and first baseman KJ Harrison, his Timber Rattles teammate, for starter Gio Gonzalez.

Trey Lipscomb

 LaVictor Antwain "Trey" Lipscomb (born June 14, 2000) is an American baseball third baseman in the Washington Nationals organization.

Lipscomb grew up in Frederick, Maryland and attended Urbana High School. He committed to play college baseball at Tennessee during his junior year. As a senior, Lipscomb hit .455 with four home runs and also had five wins and a 1.59 ERA as a pitcher.

Lipscomb played college baseball for the Tennessee Volunteers for four seasons. He played in 12 games and had one hit in 14 at bats during his freshman season. After the 2019 season, Lipscomb played collegiate summer baseball for the Wareham Gatemen of the Cape Cod Baseball League. Lipscomb batted .310 in 14 games as a junior. After the season, he played for the Johnstown Mill Rats of the Prospect League. He was named first team All-Southeastern Conference after batting .355 with 22 home runs and 84 RBIs during his senior season.

Lipscomb was selected in the third round of the 2022 Major League Baseball draft by the Washington Nationals. He signed with the Nationals on July 21, 2022, and received a $758,900 signing bonus. The Nationals assigned Lipscomb to the Fredericksburg Nationals of the Single-A Carolina League to start his professional career.

Tennessee Volunteers bio

Drew Mendoza

Andrew Keeler Mendoza (born October 10, 1997) is an American professional baseball first baseman and third baseman in the Washington Nationals organization.

Mendoza attended Lake Minneola High School in Minneola, Florida. As a senior in 2016, he hit .416 with seven home runs and 31 RBIs. He was drafted by the Detroit Tigers in the 36th round of the 2016 Major League Baseball draft but he did not sign and instead chose to enroll at Florida State University to play college baseball for the Florida State Seminoles.

In 2017, as a freshman at Florida State, Mendoza appeared in 43 games, batting .270 with ten home runs and 33 RBIs. He was named a Freshman All-American, to the All-ACC Freshman Team, and to the College World Series All-Tournament Team. Following the season, he played collegiate summer baseball with the Yarmouth–Dennis Red Sox of the Cape Cod Baseball League (CCBL). As a sophomore in 2018, Mendoza started all 63 of FSU's games, hitting .313 with seven home runs and 44 RBIs. For the second straight year, he was named an All-American. He was also named to the All-ACC Third Team. After the season, he returned to the CCBL to play for the Chatham Anglers. In 2019, Mendoza's junior year, he hit .308 with 16 home runs and 56 RBIs in 65 games.

Mendoza was considered one of the top prospects for the 2019 Major League Baseball draft. He was selected by the Washington Nationals in the third round (94th overall), and signed for $800,000. He made his professional debut with the Hagerstown Suns of the Class A South Atlantic League, and spent the whole season there, slashing .264/.377/.383 with four home runs and 25 RBIs over 55 games. He did not play a minor league game in 2020 due to the cancellation of the minor league season caused by the COVID-19 pandemic. To begin the 2021 season, he was assigned to the Harrisburg Senators of the Double-A Northeast. After slashing only .160/.274/.330 with four home runs and 11 RBIs over 34 games, he was demoted to the Wilmington Blue Rocks of the High-A East in June with whom he finished the year. Over seventy games with Wilmington, he slashed .225/.333/.312 with five home runs and thirty RBIs. He returned to Wilmington for the 2022 season. Over 101 games, he batted .208 with seven home runs and fifty RBIs.

Drew Millas

Andrew Theodore Millas (born January 15, 1998) is an American professional baseball catcher in the Washington Nationals organization.

Millas starred for three years with the Bears at Missouri State University as a catcher. In 2018, he played collegiate summer baseball with the Wareham Gatemen of the Cape Cod Baseball League. The Oakland Athletics selected Millas in the seventh round of the 2019 Major League Baseball draft. He was regarded as one of the top catching prospects in the draft and perhaps the best prospect in the Missouri Valley Conference. Millas signed with Oakland, but he did not make his professional debut until 2021, as he was held out of minor league games in 2019 and the 2020 minor league season was canceled due to the COVID-19 pandemic.

After Millas hit .255 over 59 games for the High-A Lansing Lugnuts, the Athletics traded him July 30, 2021, in a five-player deal with the Washington Nationals that also included veteran catcher Yan Gomes and utilityman Josh Harrison. Millas was assigned to the High-A Wilmington Blue Rocks after the trade. He was one of eight Nationals prospects to play for the Surprise Saguaros of the Arizona Fall League in 2021.

Mitchell Parker

Mitchell James Parker (born September 27, 1999) is an American professional baseball pitcher in the Washington Nationals organization.

Parker grew up in Albuquerque, New Mexico and attended Manzano High School. Parker was selected in the 28th round of the 2018 Major League Baseball draft by the Chicago Cubs, but opted not to sign with the team.

Parker played junior college baseball San Jacinto College. He posted a 6–0 record with 111 strikeouts and a 1.54 ERA in  innings over 13 starts in his freshman season. Parker was selected in the 27th round of the 2019 Major League Baseball draft by the Tampa Bay Rays, but decided to return to San Jacinto for a second season. In his sophomore season, Parker went 5–0 with a 1.19 ERA and 64 strikeouts in  innings pitched over six starts before the season was cut short due to the coronavirus pandemic.

Parker was selected in the fifth round of the 2020 Major League Baseball draft by the Washington Nationals. He signed with the team on June 23, 2020, and received a $100,000 signing bonus. Parker was assigned to the Fredericksburg Nationals of Low-A East to start the 2021 season. He was promoted to the High-A Wilmington Blue Rocks on July 13, 2021, after going 3–7 with a 4.08 ERA and 85 strikeouts over  innings pitched with Fredericksburg. Parker finished the season with a 4–12 record and a 4.87 ERA with 144 strikeouts in  innings pitched.

San Jacinto College bio

Todd Peterson

Todd Richard Peterson (born January 22, 1998) is an American professional baseball pitcher in the Washington Nationals organization.

A pure pitcher in high school and a reliever for the Louisiana State University Tigers in college, Peterson attracted some media attention when he batted for himself and drove in a pair of runs in an extra-innings win over South Carolina in the Southeastern Conference tournament in 2018. Peterson later told reporters that he had convinced LSU manager Paul Mainieri to let him swing away by telling him he hit "bombs" in high school, which was a lie—Peterson's high school coach at Lake Mary High School had never let him bat in a game, he confessed.

In the 2019 Major League Baseball draft, the Washington Nationals used their seventh-round pick to select Peterson out of LSU. Peterson opted to sign with the Nationals and was assigned to the Class-A Short Season Auburn Doubledays. He appeared in nine games with Auburn in 2019, both in relief and as a starter, posting a 3.19 ERA.

Peterson missed the 2020 season due to the COVID-19 pandemic that canceled all minor league play. He pitched in the Nationals' instructional league in Florida after the season. In 2021, Peterson was invited to major league spring training with the Nationals, who chose to keep him with the major league team until nearly the end of spring camp. After being reassigned to the minors, Peterson was placed on the High-A Wilmington Blue Rocks roster to begin the minor league season. Peterson pitched for the Surprise Saguaros of the Arizona Fall League after the 2021 season, one of eight players representing the Nationals. He closed out the final game of the regular season for the Saguaros, who went on to lose the championship game to the Mesa Solar Sox, and was the sole National to appear in the Fall Stars Game.

Holden Powell

Holden William Powell (born September 9, 1999) is an American professional baseball relief pitcher in the Washington Nationals organization.

Powell played for the Bruins at the University of California, Los Angeles, where he served as the team's primary closer in 2019 and 2020. In 2019, he briefly played collegiate summer baseball with the Cotuit Kettleers of the Cape Cod Baseball League. He was drafted in the third round by the Nationals in the abbreviated 2020 draft and chose to sign with the team, appearing later that summer in instructional league in Florida.

Before the 2021 season, Powell ranked as the Nationals' 20th-best prospect, according to MLB Pipeline. He was assigned to High-A Wilmington, along with several other top Nationals prospects, to begin the season that May.

Powell employs a fastball and a slider as his main pitches.

Karlo Seijas

Karlo Domingo Seijas (born September 6, 2000) is a Venezuelan professional baseball pitcher in the Washington Nationals organization.

Ranked #48 on Baseball Americas list of amateur international free agents for the 2017 signing period, Seijas was signed by the Nationals with a $300,000 bonus on July 2, 2017. He drew comparisons from scouts to countrymen Félix Hernández and Carlos Zambrano. He started his baseball career at the AQAgency Academy in Maracay, near his hometown of San Mateo, Aragua, and reportedly began playing baseball at age 3.

Seijas made his professional debut for the Dominican Summer League Nationals on June 6, 2018.

Reid SchallerRoland Reid Schaller (born April 2, 1997) is an American professional baseball pitcher in the Washington Nationals organization.

As a redshirt freshman at Vanderbilt University, Schaller was draft-eligible in 2018. The Nationals selected him in the third round of the 2018 Major League Baseball draft, also taking his Commodore teammate, Chandler Day, in the seventh round.

Schaller signed with Washington and made his professional debut, reaching Class-A Short Season with the Auburn Doubledays in 2018. Slowed by an injury, Schaller progressed in 2019, pitching in the rotation for the Class-A Hagerstown Suns.

Because of the COVID-19 pandemic, Schaller was unable to play in the 2020 season, although he appeared at the Nationals' instructional league in Florida later that year. He made his 2021 debut out of the bullpen with the High-A Wilmington Blue Rocks, to which he was assigned along with several other top Nationals prospects.

Schaller's primary pitch is a fastball that has hit  in relief appearances. He offsets it with a slider and a nascent changeup.

Jarlín SusanaJarlín Joel Susana (born March 23, 2004) is a Dominican professional baseball pitcher in the Washington Nationals organization.

Susana signed with the San Diego Padres as an international free agent in January 2022. He made his professional debut that year with the Arizona Complex League Padres.

On August 2, 2022, Suana, along with MacKenzie Gore, Luke Voit, Robert Hassell, James Wood, and C. J. Abrams were traded to the Washington Nationals in exchange for Juan Soto and Josh Bell. He started his Nationals career with the Florida Complex League Nationals and was promoted to the Fredericksburg Nationals after two starts.https://augustafreepress.com/news/jarlin-susana-debuts-for-frednats-in-7-1-win/

Thaddeus WardThaddeus J. Ward (born January 16, 1997) is an American professional baseball pitcher for the Washington Nationals of Major League Baseball (MLB).

Ward attended Bishop Verot High School in Fort Myers, Florida, and played college baseball at the University of Central Florida. He was drafted by the Boston Red Sox in the fifth round of the 2018 Major League Baseball draft.

Ward made his professional debut with the Lowell Spinners during the 2018 season, appearing in 11 games (all starts) with an 0–3 record and 3.77 ERA with 27 strikeouts in 31 innings. He spent 2019 with the Greenville Drive and Salem Red Sox, pitching to an overall 8–5 record with 2.14 ERA and 157 strikeouts in  innings. He was named the Red Sox' minor league pitcher of the year for 2019. After the 2020 minor league season was cancelled due to the COVID-19 pandemic, he was invited to participate in the Red Sox' fall instructional league. Following the 2020 season, Ward was ranked by Baseball America as the Red Sox' number 10 prospect. Ward began the 2021 season in Double-A with the Portland Sea Dogs. He made two starts, striking out 11 batters in eight innings while allowing five runs (5.63 ERA), before undergoing Tommy John surgery in early June, ending his season.

Ward began the 2022 season on the injured list with Portland. After the season, he was selected to play in the Arizona Fall League.

On December 7, 2022, Ward was selected by the Washington Nationals with the first pick in the 2022 Rule 5 draft.

James WoodJames Irvin Wood' (born September 17, 2002) is an American professional baseball outfielder in the Washington Nationals organization.

Wood grew up in Olney, Maryland and initially attended St. John's College High School, where he played baseball and basketball. He transferred to IMG Academy in Bradenton, Florida, after his sophomore season, giving up basketball in order to focus solely on baseball. He committed to play college baseball at Mississippi State shortly before transferring to IMG. After playing in the 2020 Area Code Games, Wood entered his senior year as a top prospect in the 2021 MLB Draft. Wood batted .258 as a senior, causing him to fall slightly in most draft prospect rankings.

Wood was selected with the 62nd overall pick in the 2021 Major League Baseball draft by the San Diego Padres. He signed with the team on July 20, 2021, and received a $2.6 million signing bonus. Wood was assigned to the Rookie-level Arizona Complex League Padres to start his professional career, batting .372 with three home runs, 22 RBIs, and ten stolen bases over 26 games. He opened the 2022 season with the Lake Elsinore Storm of the Single-A California League.

On August 2, 2022, Wood, along with C. J. Abrams, Luke Voit, MacKenzie Gore, Robert Hassell, and Jarlín Susana were traded to the Washington Nationals in exchange for Juan Soto and Josh Bell. The Nationals assigned him to the Fredericksburg Nationals of the Single-A Carolina League. Wood batted .293 with eight doubles, two home runs, and 17 RBIs in 21 games with Fredericksburg.

Wood's father, Kenny Wood, played college basketball at Richmond, where he is a member of the school's athletic hall of fame, and professionally in Europe.

USA Baseball profile

Team rosters, by league 
Below are the rosters of the minor league affiliates of the Washington Nationals:

Triple-A

Double-A

High-A

Single-A

Rookie

Foreign Rookie

Notes

References 

Minor
Lists of minor league baseball players